Eliezer Kulas (born 29 August 1944) is an Israeli former politician who served as a member of the Knesset for Likud between 1981 and 1988.

Biography
Born in Kyzylorda in the Soviet Union (today in Kazakhstan), Kulas made aliyah to Israel in 1948. He attended the Hugim high school in Haifa, before studying economics, statistics and law at the Hebrew University of Jerusalem, and was certified as a lawyer.

In 1962 he joined the Liberal Party. He worked as a senior advisor to the Minister of Housing and Construction, and served as director of the ministerial bureau between 1977 and 1978. He worked as an advisor to the Minister of Industry, Trade and Tourism between 1978 and 1980, and was responsible for retail trade and small industry from 1980 until 1981.

In 1981 he was elected to the Knesset on the Likud list (then an alliance of the Liberal Party, Herut and other right-wing factions), and became chairman of the Constitution, Law and Justice Committee. He was re-elected in 1984 and remained chair of the committee, but lost his seat in the 1988 elections.

References

External links

1944 births
Soviet Jews
Kazakhstani Jews
People from Kyzylorda
Soviet emigrants to Israel
Hebrew University of Jerusalem alumni
Israeli lawyers
Israeli civil servants
Living people
Likud politicians
Liberal Party (Israel) politicians
Members of the 10th Knesset (1981–1984)
Members of the 11th Knesset (1984–1988)